Oroperipatus intermedius is a species of velvet worm in the Peripatidae family. The female of this species has 32 pairs of legs. The type locality is in Bolivia.

References

Onychophorans of tropical America
Onychophoran species
Animals described in 1901